The Mid-Hudson Children's Museum (MHCM) is a children's museum in the Hudson River Valley between the larger New York City and Albany markets. In 2022, as a result of a strategic assessment and visioning process, the museum extended the age range of the children it serves. With the addition of a new science exhibition and richer and more relevant STEM programming, it aims to elevate a child’s ability and appreciation for learning through age 12. As a result, it has been re-branded from the Mid-Hudson Children’s Museum to the Mid-Hudson Discovery Museum (MHDM).

The Mid-Hudson Discovery Museum is an independent 501(c)(3) not-for-profit educational organization that is supported by admission and membership sales, program fees, donations, and grants. MHDM is a member of the American Alliance of Museums (AAM), the Association of Children's Museums (ACM), the Association of Science-Technology Centers (ASTC), and the Museum Association of New York (MANY). It receives nearly 80,000 visitors a year. 

Founded in 1989 by a group of individuals in Poughkeepsie, the Mid-Hudson Children's Museum operated in donated spaces in the City of Poughkeepsie and then in the South Hills Mall for many years. In 2002, it moved to its current home at 75 North Water Street. The building is a mid-19th century industrial brick building that formerly housed Innis Dye Works. Major upgrades to the facility were made in 2015 and 2016, and included the creation of a new Science Center and outdoor Children's Garden. 

The board of directors of MHDM is composed of volunteers, lead by president Katy Dwyer. The museum's current staff consists of thirteen employees. Upon reopening in late March of 2022, after two years of being closed, Theresa Mikoleski, stepped in to be the acting director until Jeffery Sasson, the current executive director, was hired in early June, 2022. Additional staff include Christine Jensen, Director of STEM Engagement; Christine Bissen, Campaign Administrator; Ken Hinck, Business Manager; Brittany Starke, Manager of Public Programming and Membership; and Christopher Tatavitto Jr, Guest Experience Manager.

Partnerships 
MHDM works with multiple supporters and partners for various promotions, expansion, and exhibit work.

Dyson Foundation 
In 2010, the Dyson Foundation, a Hudson Valley organization that works to improve people's lives through grant funding, promoting philanthropy, and strengthening the capacity of nonprofit organizations, took the unusual step of purchasing the Museum building. This action allowed the foundation to cement MHDM's permanent home on the waterfront, while continuing to provide general operating support. Additional recent funding supported installation of an elevator to bring the facility into ADA compliance, and accommodate visitors with disabilities and elderly guests accompanying their grandchildren. A Management Assistance Program mini-grant supported professional staff development and strategic planning.

In late 2017, a proposed expansion to MHDM was approved by the Dyson Foundation. The expanded campus, “The Museums at Upper Landing,” were set to be built on the Upper Landing Park Property in Poughkeepsie, NY. This plan, set over a proposed three years, was derailed due to COVID, and the expansion is not present at this time.

Agency Pass/Corporate Membership Program 
The Agency Pass Program and the Corporate Membership Program are opportunities for local businesses and agencies to purchase memberships for employees and wards.

This is made possible by partnerships and donations from the Ann and Abe Effron Fund and Ulster Savings Charitable Foundation.

Exhibits 
The museum has five main attractions, with multiple exhibits in each. The Early Learning Juction (ELJ) is geared towards children aged 0-4, and focuses on school-readiness. Toddlers improve motor skills, cognitive functions, literacy, and social and emotional development. 

Imagination Playground is an open-ended exhibit with giant, toddler-size foam blocks for children to build and play with. 

Rivertown is another staple of the museum. The attraction allows patrons to enter MHDM's very own miniature town featuring a fire station, kitchen, construction site, and more. This attraction focuses on cognitive development and immersive play. 

The Science Center @ MHDM opened in 2016. It is dedicated to boosting critical thinking skills through early STEM education for children ages 0-12. Popular exhibits include the Wonderdome, an exploration of the science of light, and Lift-and-Link, a collection of different building materials for children to experiment with. 

The most recent attraction is Science Revealed!, a part of the 2022 re-branding campaign. With this addition to the museum, MHDM officially expanded its capacity to teach by including exhibits for children up to age 12. It features 16 custom-made, hands-on science exhibits that invite visitors into full-body physical exploration of motion, air, forces, fluids and magnetism.

Poughkeepsie Waterfront Market 
In 2017, MHDM launched the Poughkeepsie Waterfront Market – a public farmers market bringing farm fresh produce to City of Poughkeepsie families, residents and visitors. The Market operates Monday afternoons in the Pavilion at MHDM from 3:00 pm – 6:30 pm, seasonally May through October.

Outreach 
The Mid-Hudson Discovery Museum offers hands-on programming to help children explore the world around them, practice skills and learn new things. MHDM also offers field trip opportunities for students in grades PreK - 5 to learn in a real-world environment, experience things first-hand, engage their senses, and bolster their critical thinking skills. Museum field trips are approximately 2.5 hours in length and on held on days when the Museum is closed to the public. MHDM offers two types of field trips; Explorer, where classes engage with exhibits at their own pace, and Discovery, where classes additionally work on a STEM-based prompt in correlation with NYS Science and NGSS Standards.  

MHDM also does outreach programming for schools, libraries, and other organizations in the nearby area.  

Visitors to the Mid-Hudson Discovery Museum pay a $12 general admission, with children under one being free. They offer discounts for American military personnel with identification, and EBT or SNAP cardholders. MHDM also offers annual memberships for frequent visitors.

References

Children's museums in New York (state)
Museums in Dutchess County, New York
Museums established in 1997
Buildings and structures in Poughkeepsie, New York
Tourist attractions in Poughkeepsie, New York
Association of Science-Technology Centers member institutions